The third series of the Israeli version of The Singer in the Mask premiered on Channel 12 on 17 December 2022 and concluded on 18 February 2023. The series was won by actress Yael Elkana as "Spider" with singer Adi Bity finishing second as "Fish" and singer Assaf Amdursky finishing third as "Snail".

Panelists and host 

The show is hosted by the television presenter Ido Rosenblum, with the judging panel comprising the journalist Ofira Asayag, the comedian Shahar Hason, the musical pop duo Static & Ben El Tavori, and the director Tzedi Tzarfati. In Episodes 4-5 Niv Raskin (episode 4), Assi Azar and Rotem Sela (episode 5) replaced Rozenblum after he got Covid.

Guest panelists
Throughout the third season, various guest judges appeared alongside the original, for one episode. In episodes 7-8 Assi Azar (episode 7) an Erez Tal (episode 8) replaced Static after he got Covid.

These guest panelists have included:

Contestants

Episodes

Week 1 (December 17/19)
Guest Performance: "Love Runs Out" by OneRepublic performed by Shai Gabso as "Gorilla" and Ido Rosenblum as "Rooster"

Week 2 (December 24/26)

Week 3 (December 31/January 2/3)

Week 4 (January 7/9)

Week 5 (January 14/16)

Week 6 (January 21)

Week 7 (January 25/28)

Week 8 (January 29/February 4)

Week 9 (February 6/11)

Week 10 - Semifinal & Final (February 14/18)

References

Notes

External links
 

2022 Israeli television seasons
The Singer in the Mask